Ugchelen is part of the municipality of Apeldoorn in the Gelderland province of the Netherlands, and is today seen as a neighbourhood of Apeldoorn.

Ugchelen is located South West of Apeldoorn and has about 7000 inhabitants. Like Apeldoorn, the old village thanked its growth to the paper industry, it had a total of 11 watermills. In 2006 it received a new water mill called The Bouwhof Mill.

The most important hospital in the region, Gelre hospital, is located next to Ugchelen.

Notable people 
 Robin Linschoten, politician (VVD) (born 17 April 1956 in Ugchelen)
 Peter Bosz, manager with Olympique Lyonnais and ex-trainer of AGOVV Apeldoorn and ex-professional soccer player with Feyenoord (born 21 November 1963 in Apeldoorn)
 Medy van der Laan, politician (D66) (born 14 August 1968 in Spijkenisse)
 Jan Kromkamp, professional soccer player with PSV (born 17 August 1980 in Makkinga)
 Jaime Bruinier, professional soccer player with AGOVV (born 28 June 1987 in Ugchelen)

Gallery

References

External links
 
 Official site (in Dutch)

Populated places in Gelderland
Apeldoorn